Lyres are a Boston-area garage rock band led by Jeff Conolly, founded in 1979 following the breakup of DMZ. Their most popular songs included "Don't Give It Up Now," 'She Pays The Rent' and "Help You Ann". The original lineup of the band featured Conolly, Rick Coraccio (bass), Ricky Carmel (guitar), and Paul Murphy (drums). 

Former DMZ members Coraccio, Murphy, Peter Greenberg, and Mike Lewis all rejoined Connolly in Lyres at some point from 1979 to the early 2000s. The A-Bones drummer Miriam Linna, (a former drummer for The Cramps) and then A-Bones, Yo La Tengo and former Lyres bass player Mike Lewis filled-in with Lyres for a show in 1986. Stiv Bators of The Dead Boys and Lords of the New Church, and Wally Tax of The Outsiders also recorded with Lyres in the late 1980s. 

Lyres were less active in 1989, due to Conolly living in California for a brief period. After a renewed period of activity in the early 1990s, the band went through a dormant period until 1999. The band has been playing regularly during the last two years. Conolly is the one member who has been in every lineup during the large number of Lyres personnel changes. In 2009, Lyres played at the Go Sinner So festival in Madrid and an additional date in Porto Nuovo. This line-up included a fill-in Peter Greenberg on guitar.

Current line-up
Jeff Conolly (organ, vocals)
Steve Aquino (guitar)
Paul Murphy (drums)
Dave Szczepaniak (bass)

Discography (incomplete)

LP albums
On Fyre (1984)
Lyres Lyres (1986)
Recorded Live At Cantones ( Pryct PR-1003 1987)
A Promise Is a Promise (1988)
She Pays the Rent Live (1988)
Live 1983 Let's Have A Party!! ( Pryct PR-1004 1989)
Happy Now (1992)
Some Lyres (1994)

EPs
AHS1005 12" 45 rpm (Ace of Hearts 1981)  [title commonly referenced as "Buried Alive" after the first track on the disc]
Lyres (1985), New Rose
Nobody But Lyres 12" 33 rpm (TAANG! Records 1992)

Singles
"How Do You Know?" b/w "Don't Give It Up Now" Sounds Interesting S145-002A/B 1979
"Help You Ann"
"Self Centered Girl" (Telstar Records) 1993
"We Sell Soul" b/w "Busy Body" Tanng Records 62 NR 18682-1 2006
"Don't Give It Up Now" c/w "How Do You Know?" Dirty Water Records 2007

Compact Discs
On Fyre + 8 Bonus Tracks (New Rose 35 CD 1984)
A Promise Is A Promise ((Ace Of Hearts - AHS 325) 1988)

Compilations
 "Hotel Massachusetts"

In other media 
The song "Help You Ann" was featured on the game Destroy all Humans 2 and on the TV show Rescue Me.

Related bands
Barrence Whitfield And The Savages - Howard Ferguson, Peter Greenberg,  Phil Lenker
DMZ - Jeff Conolly, Mike Lewis, Peter Greenberg, Paul Murphy
The Real Kids - Howard Ferguson
The Zantees - Mike Lewis
The A-Bones - Mike Lewis
Yo La Tengo - Mike Lewis
Darker My Love - Jared Everett
Orange Rooftops - T.J. O'Brien, Jeff Gregory, Jeff Phelps, Jason Eaton

References

External links
 https://web.archive.org/web/20061021090146/http://www.rockinboston.com/lyres.htm

Musical groups established in 1979
Musical groups from Boston